The Isle of Wight Rural District was a rural district on the Isle of Wight from 1894 to 1974 covering most of the island, apart from urban areas. In 1933, the district was reduced by the creation of the Sandown-Shanklin and Ventnor urban districts.

In 1974, under the Local Government Act 1972, it was merged with these two urban districts to form the new non-metropolitan South Wight district.

References
Isle of Wight at Vision of Britain

History of the Isle of Wight
Local government on the Isle of Wight
Districts of England created by the Local Government Act 1894
Districts of England abolished by the Local Government Act 1972
Rural districts of England